The 1946 United States Senate election in Wyoming took place on November 5, 1946. Democratic Senator Joseph C. O'Mahoney ran for re-election to a third term. In the general election, he faced Republican Harry B. Henderson, the former Chairman of the Republican Party of Wyoming and a former State Senator. Despite the strong performance of the Republican Party nationally, O'Mahoney's popularity was strong enough for him to win re-election yet again by a wide margin, though slightly narrower than his 1940 re-election.

Democratic primary

Candidates
 Joseph C. O'Mahoney, incumbent U.S. Senator

Results

Republican Primary

Candidates
 Harry B. Henderson, former Chairman of the Republican Party of Wyoming, former State Senator, 1940 Republican candidate for the U.S. Senate

Results

General election

Results

References

1946
Wyoming
United States Senate